Isaac Daniel "Ike" Rosefelt (born May 3, 1985) is an American-Israeli professional basketball player who is currently a free agent. He played college basketball for Bowling Green Falcons and St. Thomas Tommies before playing professionally in Spain, Portugal, France and Israel, where he was named four-time Israeli League All-Star.

Early life and college career
Rosefelt was born on May 3, 1985, in Washington, D.C. He was adopted at the age of two months by a Jewish family and raised in Saint Paul, Minnesota.

Rosefelt attended Saint Thomas Academy in Mendota Heights, Minnesota. He played college basketball for Bowling Green State University's Falcons and University of St. Thomas's Tommies.

In his senior year at St. Thomas, Rosefelt averaged 17.9 points, 10.1 rebounds and 2.4 blocks per game.

Rosefelt was a two-time D3hoops.com All-America selection. On March 21, 2006, Rosefelt was named NABC All-American. On September 17, 2013, Rosefelt was inducted into the University of St. Thomas Athletic Hall of Fame.

Professional career
On July 31, 2007, Rosefelt started his professional career in Spain, signing a one-year deal with Córdoba of the LEB Bronce.

On November 28, 2008, Rosefelt signed with the Portuguese team Académica de Coimbra for the 2008–09 season. However, in March 2009, Rosefelt parted ways with Académica and joined the French team Denek for the rest of the season.

On November 23, 2009, Rosefelt signed with the Israeli team Bnei Hasharon for the 2009–10 season.

On October 5, 2010, Rosefelt signed with Ironi Ramat Gan of the Liga Leumit for the 2010–11 season.

On December 13, 2011, Rosefelt returned to Bnei Hasharon for a second stint, signing for the rest of the season. On April 1, 2012, Rosefelt recorded a career-high 28 points, shooting 11-of-14 from the field, along with 15 rebounds in an 84–81 win over Barak Netanya. He was subsequently named Israeli League Player of the Week. Rosefelt finished the season as the Israeli League second leading player in rebounds (9.2 per game), just behind Bryant Dunston. On June 1, 2012, Rosefelt signed a one-year contract extension with Bnei Hasharon.

On June 30, 2013, Rosefelt signed a two-year deal with Hapoel Holon. On October 13, 2014, Rosefelt recorded 13 points and sets an Israeli Premier League single-game record with 26 rebounds in an 89–72 win over Hapoel Gilboa Galil. On October 31, 2014, Rosefelt was named Israeli League Player of the Month for games played in October.

On July 3, 2016, Rosefelt signed with Hapoel Jerusalem for the 2016–17 season. Roseflet went on to win the 2016 Israeli League Cup and the 2017 Israeli League Championship with Jerusalem.

On July 12, 2017, Rosefelt signed with Hapoel Eilat for the 2017–18 season. On June 5, 2018, Rosefelt recorded a season-high 22 points, shooting 10-of-16 from the field, along with 7 rebounds in an 87–70 win over his former team Hapoel Holon.
Rosefelt helped Eilat to reach the 2018 Israeli League Playoffs, where they eventually lost to Hapoel Holon.

On July 18, 2018, Rosefelt signed a one-year deal with Maccabi Ashdod.

On July 17, 2019, Rosefelt signed with Hapoel Haifa of the Israeli National League, joining his former head coach Elad Hasin. On September 9, 2019, Rosefelt parted ways with Hapoel Haifa due to personal reasons.

Career statistics

Domestic Leagues

Source: Basket.co.il & RealGM.com

References

External links
RealGM profile
Basket.co.il profile
Agent website

1985 births
Living people
American expatriate basketball people in France
American expatriate basketball people in Israel
American expatriate basketball people in Portugal
American expatriate basketball people in Spain
Basketball players from Saint Paul, Minnesota
Bnei HaSharon players
Bowling Green Falcons men's basketball players
Centers (basketball)
Hapoel Eilat basketball players
Hapoel Holon players
Hapoel Jerusalem B.C. players
Ironi Ramat Gan players
Israeli men's basketball players
Maccabi Ashdod B.C. players
Sportspeople from the San Francisco Bay Area
St. Thomas (Minnesota) Tommies men's basketball players